The Neoteleostei is a large clade of bony fish that includes the Ateleopodidae (jellynoses), Aulopiformes (lizardfish), Myctophiformes (lanternfish), Polymixiiformes (beardfish), Percopsiformes (Troutperches), Gadiformes (cods), Zeiformes (dories), Lampriformes (oarfish, opah, ribbonfish), and the populous clade of the Acanthopterygii which includes the Beryciformes (squirrelfish) and the Percomorpha (many families such as the tuna, seahorses, gobies, cichlids, flatfish, wrasse, perches, anglerfish, pufferfish).

References

Fish superorders
Euteleostei